Shchyolkovskaya is a Moscow Metro station on the Arbatsko-Pokrovskaya Line. It is an Eastern terminus of the line. It opened in 1963.

Name
Its name owes to the location near the Shchyolkovo highway.

Building
The pillars are faced with dark green marble. The walls were originally tiled by yellow and black ceramic tiles, but a modern metalloplastic cladding was applied in 2002, giving the station a cleaner look. The architects were Ivan Taranov and Nadezhda Bykova.

Traffic
The station is highly loaded due to nearby Moscow Central Bus Terminal.

References

Moscow Metro stations
Railway stations in Russia opened in 1963
Arbatsko-Pokrovskaya Line
Railway stations located underground in Russia